Jose Ariel Jimenez Rivera, professionally known as Ariel Rivera (born September 1, 1966), is a Filipino recording artist and actor.

Rivera was born in Manila, Philippines but has since migrated with his family to Canada. He has since become a successful singer-songwriter, actor, and Aliw award-winning artist. He is dubbed as "Kilabot ng Kolehiyala", a title formerly bestowed upon Hajji Alejandro, a popular Filipino singer in the 1970s.

Career

Music career
Rivera was a graduate of architecture in Canada and he was also an undergraduate of Psychology before his singing talent was accidentally discovered while he was on holiday in the Philippines. In 1989, Musiko Records & BMG Records (Pilipinas) Inc. (now known as Sony Music Philippines) signed Rivera to their label. His self-titled debut album was released after two years. The first single, "Sana Kahit Minsan" was a No. 1 pop-r&b crossover hit. The album went 3× platinum. In 1991, he quickly released his second album, Simple Lang. This album also went 3× platinum.

In 1994, Rivera began recording new material for his next album, Photograph. Photograph was released in 1995. His album reached Gold status in the Philippines.
In 1999, he played the title character of Rama in the staging of Rama at Sita – The Musical by SK Entertainment at the University Theatre.

Acting career
In 1992, Rivera tried acting. His first starring role in the film Bakit Labis Kitang Mahal earned him a Best Supporting Actor award in the 1992 Metro Manila Film Festival. He landed a lead role opposite Sharon Cuneta in 1993's "Ikaw". He also co-starred in Isang Sulok Ng Mga Pangarap (1994); Anghel Na Walang Langit (1995); Minsan May Pangarap: The Guce Family Story (1995); May Nagmamahal Sa Iyo (1996), Ikaw Pala Ang Mahal Ko (1997) and Bata, bata ... Pa'no Ka Ginawa? (1998).

Acting awards
1992: Metro Manila Film Festival Best Supporting Actor for "Bakit Labis Kitang Mahal"
2005: 2nd Golden Screen [Entertainment TV] Awards Outstanding Lead Actor in a Drama Series for "Forever In My Heart" (GMA-7)

Personal life
Rivera has 2 older siblings (Leo and Gemma), and 2 younger siblings (Orven and Marvin). 

He married actress Anna Gianelli de Belen, on December 22, 1997, in Santuario de San José, and both did a film released five months before their marriage entitled "Ikaw Pala Ang Mahal Ko". The couple has two sons: Joaquín Andrés (born January 29, 1999) and Julio Alessandro (born November 6, 2000).

Albums

Ariel Rivera 3× platinum (300,000 copies)
Simple Lang 3× platinum (300,000 copies)
Photograph Gold (50,000 copies)
Paskong Walang Katulad Gold (50,000 copies)
Paskong Walang Katulad, the special Ariel Rivera Deluxe Christmas album (released in 2009)
Getting to Know Platinum (100,000 copies)
Aawitin Ko Na Lang Gold (50,000 copies)
In My Life 2× platinum (200,000 copies)
Platinum Hits 5× platinum (500,000 copies)
Once Again (released in 2008)

Collaborations
Ryan Cayabyab Silver Album (Sony BMG Music Philippines, Inc., 1996)
Something More (JesCom Foundation, Inc., 2001)
Signature Hits OPM's Best Vol. 2 (Viva Records Corp. & Vicor Music Corp., 2009)

Awards
 Best New Male Artist- Awit Awards, 1991
 Best Performance by a New Male Recording Artist- 1992
 Best Supporting Actor – Bakit Labis Kitang Mahal, Metro Manila Film Festival, 1992
 Music Video of the Year- Tunay Na Ligaya, 1997
 Best Vocal Performance of the Year by a Duet/Group- I Don't Love You Anymore with Lea Salonga, 1999
 Outstanding Lead Actor- Forever in my Heart, 2nd Golden Screen Awards, 2005
 Best Actor- Parola, Bahaghari Awards

Filmography

Television

Movies

References

1966 births
20th-century Filipino male singers
Filipino pop singers
Filipino male film actors
Filipino Roman Catholics
Filipino male television actors
Filipino television variety show hosts
Filipino emigrants to Canada
Naturalized citizens of Canada
Ariel Rivera albums
ABS-CBN personalities
GMA Network personalities
TV5 (Philippine TV network) personalities
Living people
Singers from Manila
Filipino male comedians
20th-century Filipino male actors
21st-century Filipino male actors